Giulio Cesare Fellini (born c. 1600) was an Italian painter of the Baroque period.  He was a pupil of  Gabriele Ferrantini and Annibale Carracci. He excelled in painting horses and figures, and was assisted by his son Marcantonio Fellini.

References

17th-century Italian painters
Italian male painters
Italian Baroque painters